Blind Love is the second studio album by Australian indie pop band Ratcat. It was released on 20 May 1991. It was their most successful album and went to peak at No.1 in Australia.

It was nominated for Breakthrough Artist - Album at the ARIA Music Awards of 1992.

Reception
Blind Love was given 3 out of 5 in a review by All Music.

In The Sell-In, Craig Mathieson said the album, "lived up to Simon Day's belief in the disposability ethic. It spat out one buzzsaw, troublegum tune after another, delivered with punkish verve and given the sheen rooArt hoped for by producer Nick Mainsbridge. It sounded impossibly simple, but that's what distinguished it from the pack."

Track listing

Note: On the LP/Cassette version, tracks 1-6 are "side A" and tracks 7-11 are "side B"

Credits
 Artwork by [Illustrations] – Simon Day
 Photography – Linda Marlin 
 Producer, Recorded By – Nick Mainsbridge
 Producer [Assistant] – Rob Lowlands, Scott Christie
 Backing Vocals – Margaret Urlich, Robyn St. Clare

Charts

Weekly charts

Year-end charts

Certifications

Release history

See also
List of number-one albums in Australia during the 1990s

References

1991 albums
Ratcat albums